Diocese of Augsburg is a diocese of the Catholic Church in Germany. The diocese is a suffragan of the Archdiocese of Munich.

History

Early history
The present city of Augsburg appears in Strabo as Damasia, a stronghold of the Licatii; in 14 BC, it became a Roman colony known as Augusta Vindelicorum, received the rights of a city from Hadrian and soon became of great importance as an arsenal and the point of junction of several important trade routes.

Though the beginnings of Christianity within the limits of the present diocese are shrouded in obscurity, its teachings were probably brought there by soldiers or merchants. According to the acts of the martyrdom of St. Afra, who with her handmaids suffered at the stake for Christ, there existed in Augsburg early in the fourth century a Christian community under Bishop Narcissus. Dionysius, uncle of St. Afra, is mentioned as his Successor.

Nothing authentic is known about the history of the Augsburg Church during the centuries immediately succeeding, but it survived the collapse of Roman power in Germany and the turbulence of the great migrations. It is true that two catalogues of the Bishops of Augsburg, dating from the eleventh and twelfth centuries, mention several bishops of this primitive period, but the first whose record has received indubitable historical corroboration is Wikterp (or Wicbpert), who was bishop about 739 or 768. He took part in several synods convened by Saint Boniface in Germany; in company with Magnus of Füssen, founded the monastery of Füssen; and with Saint Boniface, dedicated the monastery at Benediktbeuern.

Under either Saint Wikterp or his successor, Tazzo (or Tozzo), about whom little is known, many monasteries were established, e.g. the abbeys of Wessobrunn, Ellwangen, Polling and Ottobeuren. At this time, also, the see, hitherto suffragan to the Patriarchate of Aquileia, was placed among the suffragan sees of the newly founded Archdiocese of Mainz (746). Saint Simpert (c. 810), hitherto abbot of Murbach, and a relative of Charlemagne, renovated many churches and monasteries laid waste in the wars of the Franks and Bavarians, and during the incursions of the Avari; he built the first cathedral of Augsburg in honour of the Virgin Mary; and obtained from the Emperor Charlemagne an exact definition of his diocesan limits. His jurisdiction extended at that time from the Iller eastward over the Lech, north of the Danube to the Alb, and south to the spurs of the Alps. Moreover, various estates and villages in the valley of the Danube, and in Tyrol, belonged to the diocese.

Prince-Bishopric

Restoration
After the Congress of Vienna, where the diocese was restored, Franz Karl von Hohenlohe-Schillingsfürst (d. 1819) was appointed bishop and Joseph Maria von Fraunberg was soon called to the archdiocese of Bamberg. There, they devolved upon their successors the important task of rearranging the external conditions and reanimating religious life, which had suffered sorely. Ignatius Albert von Riegg (1824–36) was successful in his endeavors to further the interests of souls, to raise the standard of popular education through the medium of numerous ordinances and frequent visitations. He assigned the administration and direction of studies in the Lyceum to the monks of the Benedictine Abbey of St. Stephen in Augsburg, founded by King Ludwig I of Bavaria (1834).

Petrus von Richarz (1837–55) displayed energy and persistent zeal in promoting the interests of his diocese and the Catholic Church in general, and encouraged the giving of missions to the people, the establishment of many religious institutions for the care of the sick and for educational purposes, and carefully superintended the training of the clergy. The same spirit characterized the labours of the succeeding bishops: Michael von Deinlein (1856–58), who after a short episcopate was raised to the Archbishopric of Bamberg; Pankratius von Dinkel (1858–94), under whom both seminaries and the deaf and dumb asylum were established in Dillingen, and many monastic institutions were founded; Petrus von Hotzl (1895-1902) whose episcopate was marked by the attention paid to social and intellectual pursuits, and the number of missions given among the people as well as by the solemn celebration of the beatification of the pious nun Crescentia Hoss. He was succeeded by Maximilian von Lingg.

Bishops

To 1000
 Narzissus, fourth century
 Dionysius of Augsburg (Uncle of Afra of Augsburg), uncertain
 -unknown
 Zosimus
 Perewelf (Beowulf)
 Tagebert (Dagobert)
 Manno
 Wicho
 Bricho
 Zeizzo (Zeiso)
 Marchmann (Markmann)
 Wikterp (Wicterp), 738–772
 Tozzo (Thosso), 772–778
 Simpert, 778–807
 Hanto, 807–815
 Nidker (Nidgar), 816–830
 Udalmann, 830–832
 Lanto, 833–860
 Witgar, 861–887
 Adalbero (Adalberon von Dillingen), 887–909
 Hiltin, 909–923
 Ulrich I (Ulrich I von Dillingen), 923–973
 Henry I (Henry von Geisenhausen), 973–982
 Eticho (Eticho der Welfe), 982–988
 Luitold (Ludolf von Hohenlowe), 989–996
 Gebehard (Gebhard von Ammerthal), 996–1000

1000 to 1300
 Siegfried I, 1001–1006
 Bruno, 1006–1029
 Eberhard I, 1029–1047
 Henry II, 1047–1063
  Embrico, 1063–1077
  Siegfried II, 1077–1096
 Hermann von Vohburg, 1096–1133
 Walter I. von Dillingen, 1133–1152
 Konrad von Hirscheck, 1152–1167
 Hartwig I. von Lierheim, 1167–1184
 Udalschalk, 1184–1202
 Hartwig II, 1202–1208
 Siegfried III. von Rechberg, 1208–1227
 Siboto von Seefeld, 1227–1247
 Hartmann of Dillingen, 1248–1286
 Siegfried IV von Algertshausen, 1286–1288
 Wolfhard von Roth, 1288–1302

1300 to 1500
 Degenhard von Hellenstein, 1303–1307
 Friedrich I Spät von Faimingen, 1309–1331
 Ulrich II von Schönegg, 1331–1337
 Henry III von Schönegg, 1337–1348
 Marquard of Randeck, 1348–1365
 Walter II von Hochschlitz, 1365–1369
 Johann I. Schadland, 1371–1372
 Burkhard von Ellerbach, 1373–1404
 Eberhard II von Kirchberg, 1404–1413
 Friedrich von Grafeneck, 1413–1414
 Anselm von Nenningen, 1414–1423
 Peter von Schaumberg, 1424–1469
 Johann II of Werdenberg, 1469–1486
 Friedrich von Hohenzollern, 1486–1505

1500 to 1800
 Heinrich von Lichtenau, 1505–1517
 Christoph von Stadion, 1517–1543
 Otto Truchsess von Waldburg, 1543–1573
 Johann Eglof von Knöringen, 1573–1575
 Marquard von Berg, 1575–1591
 Johann Otto von Gemmingen, 1591–1598
 Heinrich von Knöringen, 1599–1646
 Sigismund Francis, Archduke of Austria, 1646–1665
 Johann Christoph von Freyberg-Allmendingen, 1666–1690
 Alexander Sigismund von der Pfalz-Neuburg, 1690–1737
 Johann Franz Schenk von Stauffenberg, 1737–1740
 Joseph Ignaz Philipp von Hessen-Darmstadt, 1740–1768
 Prince Clemens Wenceslaus of Saxony, 1768–1812

Since 1800
Franz Friedrich von Sturmfeder, General vicar 1812–1818
 Franz Karl Joseph Fürst von Hohenlohe-Waldenburg-Schillingsfürst (5 February 1818 Appointed – 9 October 1819 Died)
 Joseph Maria Johann Nepomuk Freiherr von Fraunberg (6 December 1819 Appointed – 4 March 1824 Appointed, Archbishop of Bamberg)
Ignatz Albert (Joseph Ignatz Alexius) von Riegg, O.S.A. (4 March 1824 Appointed – 15 August 1836 Died)
Johann Peter von Richarz  (20 September 1836 Appointed – 2 July 1855 Died)
Michael von Deinlein (12 January 1856 Appointed – 17 June 1858 Appointed, Archbishop of Bamberg)
Pankratius von Dinkel (16 July 1858 Appointed – 8 October 1894 Died)
Petrus von Hötzl, O.F.M. (7 November 1894 Appointed – 9 March 1902 Died)
Maximilian von Lingg (18 March 1902 Appointed – 31 May 1930 Died)
Joseph Kumpfmüller (17 September 1930 Appointed – 9 February 1949 Died)
Josef Freundorfer (9 July 1949 Appointed – 11 April 1963 Died)
Josef Stimpfle (10 September 1963 Appointed – 30 March 1992 Retired)
Viktor Josef Dammertz, O.S.B. (24 December 1992 Appointed – 9 Jun 2004 Retired)
Walter Mixa (16 July 2005 Appointed – 8 May 2010 Resigned)
Konrad Zdarsa (8 July 2010 – 4 July 2019)

Bertram Johannes Meier (29 January 2020 Appointed -)

Auxiliary bishops
Jean Heysterbach, O.P. (1436–1447)
Wilhelm Mader, O. Praem. (1447–1450)
Martin Dieminger (1450–1460)
Jodok Seitz, O. Praem. (1460–1471)
Jakob Goffredi (1471–1473)
Ulrich Geislinger, O.F.M. (1474–1493)
Johann Kerer (1493–1506)
Heinrich Negelin (Nagele) (1506–1520)
Johann Laymann (1521–1546)
Marcus Vetter (1546–1554)
Sebastian Breuning (1586–1618)
Michael Dornvogel 1554–1586)
Peter Wall (1618–1630)
Sebastian Müller (1631–1644)
Kaspar Zeiler (1646–1665)
Johann Eustach Egolf von Westernach (1681–1707)
Johann Kasimir Röls (1708–1715)
Franz Theodor von Guttenberg (1716–1717)
Johann Jakob von Mayer (1718–1749)
Franz Xaver von Adelmann von Adelmannsfelden (1750–1787)
Johann Nepomuk August Ungelter von Deisenhausen (1779–1804)
Franz Karl Joseph von Hohenlohe-Waldenburg-Schillingsfürst (1802–1818) Appointed Bishop of Augsburg
Johann Baptist Judas Thaddeus von Keller (1816–1828)
Peter Göbl (1911–1916)
Josef Kumpfmüller (1930–1949)
Franz Xaver Eberle 1934–1951)
Manfred Müller (1972–1982)
Karl Reth (1916–1933)
Joseph Zimmermann (1952–1972)
Rudolf Schmid (1972–1990)
Maximilian Ziegelbauer (1983–1998)
Josef Grünwald (1995–2011)
Anton Losinger (2000–)
Florian Wörner (2012–)

See also
 Basilica of Sts. Peter and Paul, Dillingen

References

 

Augsburg
19th century in Bavaria
Christianity in Bavaria
Roman Catholic dioceses in Germany